Peter Horák (born 7 December 1983 in Bratislava) is a Slovak high jumper.

Achievements

References
 

1983 births
Living people
Slovak male high jumpers
Athletes (track and field) at the 2008 Summer Olympics
Olympic athletes of Slovakia
Sportspeople from Bratislava
Competitors at the 2007 Summer Universiade